Arina Bilotserkivska (born December 3, 1989) is a Ukrainian basketball player for BC Interkhim Odesa and the Ukrainian national team.

She participated at the EuroBasket Women 2017.

References

1989 births
Living people
Ukrainian women's basketball players
Sportspeople from Zhytomyr
Point guards